Lin Ming-chen is a Taiwanese politician. He was a member of the Legislative Yuan from 2005 to 2014, and served as magistrate of Nantou County. from 2014 to 2022. In both offices, Lin was succeeded by Hsu Shu-hua.

Education
Lin earned his bachelor's degree in architecture from China Junior College of Technology and master's degree in leisure service management from Chaoyang University of Technology.

Early political career
Lin led Jiji Township from 1994 to 2002, was subsequently elected to the Nantou County Council until 2006, and served on the Legislative Yuan between 2008 and 2014.

Magistrate of Nantou County

2014 Magistrate election

Lin was elected as the Magistrate of Nantou County after winning the 2014 Nantou County magistrate election held on 29 November 2014.

2016 Mainland China visit
In September 2016, Lin with another seven magistrates and mayors from Taiwan visited Beijing, which were Hsu Yao-chang (Magistrate of Miaoli County), Chiu Ching-chun (Magistrate of Hsinchu County), Liu Cheng-ying (Magistrate of Lienchiang County), Yeh Hui-ching (Deputy Mayor of New Taipei City), Chen Chin-hu (Deputy Magistrate of Taitung County), Fu Kun-chi (Magistrate of Hualien County) and Wu Cherng-dean (Deputy Magistrate of Kinmen County). Their visit was aimed to reset and restart cross-strait relations after President Tsai Ing-wen took office on 20 May 2016. The eight local leaders reiterated their support of One-China policy under the 1992 consensus. They met with Taiwan Affairs Office Head Zhang Zhijun and Chairperson of the Chinese People's Political Consultative Conference Yu Zhengsheng.

2018 Magistrate election
The Kuomintang endorsed Lin for a second term as Nantou County magistrate in December 2017.

Later political career
Lin contested the 2023 Nantou legislative by-election, seeking Hsu Shu-hua's vacant seat. During the campaign, Lin was accused of plagiarizing his master's thesis.

Personal life
Lin is married and has a son.

References

External links

 

1951 births
Living people
China University of Science and Technology alumni
Members of the 8th Legislative Yuan
Members of the 7th Legislative Yuan
Nantou County Members of the Legislative Yuan
Magistrates of Nantou County
Mayors of places in Taiwan